Gabrielle with Open Blouse (French: Gabrielle avec la chemise ouverte) is an oil on canvas painting by French impressionist artist Pierre-Auguste Renoir. It is in the collection of the Tehran Museum of Contemporary Art, but is not on public view because of the model's open blouse.

Gabrielle was Gabrielle Renard, a cousin of Renoir's wife Aline Charigot. She became the family's nanny in 1894 and later modelled many times for Renoir before becoming his carer. Only after his death in 1919 did she marry and move to live in America.

Notes 

Portraits by Pierre-Auguste Renoir
Portraits of women
1907 paintings
20th-century portraits
Paintings in the collection of the Tehran Museum of Contemporary Art